The Best NFL Player ESPY Award has been presented annually since 1993 to the National Football League player adjudged to be the best in a given calendar year, namely in the NFL season immediately precedent to the holding of the ESPY Awards ceremony.

Between 1993 and 2004, the award voting panel comprised variously fans; sportswriters and broadcasters, sports executives, and retired sportspersons, termed collectively experts; but balloting thereafter has been exclusively by fans over the Internet from amongst choices selected by the ESPN Select Nominating Committee.

Through the 2001 iteration of the ESPY Awards, ceremonies were conducted in February of each year to honor achievements over the previous calendar year; awards presented thereafter are conferred in June and reflect performance from the June previous.

In 2014, Peyton Manning of the Denver Broncos became the first 3-time winner breaking a tie with Barry Sanders, Brett Favre, Marshall Faulk. Aaron Rodgers would later surpass him in 2017 when he won his fourth. The award wasn't awarded in 2020 due to the COVID-19 pandemic.

Winners
 Player was a member of the winning team in the Super Bowl.   Player was a member of the losing team in the Super Bowl. * NFL MVP† Super Bowl MVP

Multiple-time winners

See also
National Football League Most Valuable Player Award
NFL Defensive Player of the Year Award
NFL Offensive Player of the Year Award
UPI AFL-AFC Player of the Year
UPI NFC Player of the Year

References

ESPY Awards
National Football League trophies and awards